Cresson is a ghost town in Northampton Township, Rooks County, Kansas, United States.

History
Cresson, Kansas (named for Cresson, PA) was granted a post office in 1879. In 1887, rumors circulated that Union Pacific Railroad would lay track  miles to the south of Cresson. Many citizens and businesses abandoned Cresson to form the community of New Cresson along the expected railroad route. In 1888, Union Pacific established the railroad near the original location of Cresson, then created Palco as a depot. Nothing is left of Cresson or New Cresson.

References

Former populated places in Rooks County, Kansas
Former populated places in Kansas
1879 establishments in Kansas
Populated places established in 1879